The following is a list of professional "Christian dance companies," which in this context shall be defined as professional dance companies born out of their leadership's commitment to integrating their Christian faith with their approach to performing arts. 

 Ballet Magnificat!
 Paradosi Ballet Company
 Ballet 5:8

Dance organizations
Christian performing arts